The Community Development Financial Institutions Fund (CDFI Fund) promotes economic revitalization in distressed communities throughout the United States by providing financial assistance and information to community development financial institutions (CDFI). An agency of the United States Department of the Treasury, it was established through the Riegle Community Development and Regulatory Improvement Act of 1994. Financial institutions, which may include banks, credit unions, loan funds, and community development venture capital funds, can apply to the CDFI Fund for formal certification as a CDFI. As of September 1, 2005, there were 747 certified CDFIs in the U.S. The CDFI Fund offers a variety of financial programs to provide capital to CDFIs, such as the Financial Assistance Program, Technical Assistance Program, Bank Enterprise Award Program, and the New Markets Tax Credit Program.

One of the oldest nonprofit loan funds in the United States, Enterprise Community Loan Fund - a subsidiary of Enterprise Community Partners has loaned more than $725 million to help build or renovate 91,000 affordable homes. They also offer local funds in Atlanta, Louisiana, Los Angeles, and New York City. Other, larger nonprofit loan funds have typically invested nearly $2 billion per loan fund (as of 2017) including Low Income Investment Fund, Boston Community Capital, Reinvestment Fund, Capital Impact Partners, Local Initiatives Support Corp and Self-Help. Within the field, only a handful of CDFIs have achieved an investment grade rating from Standard & Poor - including Local Initiative Support Corp, Reinvestment Fund, Capital Impact Partners.

In 1998, City First Bank was certified as Washington, DC's first CDFI bank. Since then, and as of December 31, 2015, City First has channeled over $1 billion of capital into low and moderate income communities. $422 in New Markets Tax Credits have help to build institutions such as THEARC in deep southeast, DC where over 80% of the students qualify for free or reduced lunch; and the Atlas Performing Arts Center, making arts accessible to all on the now burgeoning H Street, northeast DC. Loans towards small businesses, affordable housing, educational facilities, the arts, and health centers have totaled $591, fueling DC's renewed economy and culture.

See also
 Title 12 of the Code of Federal Regulations

References

External links
 
 Community Development Financial Institutions Fund in the Federal Register

United States Department of the Treasury agencies
Community development financial institutions
1994 establishments in the United States
Government agencies established in 1994